David Camilo Córdoba Rivera (born December 12, 1980) is a retired Colombian footballer.

Career
He debuted as a professional in 2001 playing for Centauros Villavicencio, because of great success with this club he was then transferred to Cúcuta Deportivo participating with them in Copa Libertadores. Later Atlético Nacional saw his potential later offering him a contract for two years.

External links
 
 

1980 births
Living people
Footballers from Medellín
Colombian footballers
Centauros Villavicencio footballers
Cúcuta Deportivo footballers
Atlético Nacional footballers
Atlético Huila footballers
Águilas Doradas Rionegro players
Categoría Primera A players
Association football midfielders